Jorge Alberto Mendonça Paulino (born 19 September 1938), known as Mendonça, is a Portuguese-Angolan former footballer who played as a striker.

Having spent the vast majority of his career in Spain, he amassed La Liga totals of 205 matches and 69 goals over the course of 12 seasons, almost all with Atlético Madrid, with which he won five major titles.

Club career
Born in Luanda, Portuguese Angola, Mendonça started his career with S.C. Braga. In early 1958, the 19-year-old moved to Spain where he would remain for the rest of his playing days, representing Deportivo de La Coruña for a couple of months then signing for Atlético Madrid. He made his debut for the latter club on 14 September in a 2–0 home win against Real Oviedo, scoring the last goal; three days later he was one four players netting braces in an 8–0 trouncing of Drumcondra F.C. for the season's European Cup.

During his nine-year spell at the Vicente Calderón Stadium, Mendonça would never appear in more than 25 La Liga matches, but was a solid attacking contributor as the Colchoneros won three Copa del Rey trophies and the 1962 UEFA Cup Winners' Cup, with the player scoring in the final's replay, a 3–0 victory over ACF Fiorentina. He left with competitive totals of 235 games and 91 goals, retiring in June 1970 after unassuming top-flight spells with FC Barcelona (two seasons) and RCD Mallorca (one, team relegation).

Honours
Atlético Madrid
La Liga: 1965–66
Copa del Generalísimo: 1959–60, 1960–61, 1964–65
UEFA Cup Winners' Cup: 1961–62

Barcelona
Copa del Generalísimo: 1967–68

References

External links

1938 births
Living people
Footballers from Luanda
Angolan footballers
Portuguese footballers
Association football forwards
Primeira Liga players
S.C. Braga players
La Liga players
Segunda División players
Deportivo de La Coruña players
Atlético Madrid footballers
FC Barcelona players
RCD Mallorca players
Angolan expatriate footballers
Portuguese expatriate footballers
Expatriate footballers in Spain
Angolan expatriate sportspeople in Spain